The 2020 Pennsylvania Turnpike crash occurred in Mount Pleasant, Pennsylvania, on the Pennsylvania Turnpike in icy conditions at around 3:40 am on January 5, 2020. It was sparked by a 52-passenger tour bus traveling downhill, which struck an embankment and flipped on its side, causing a chain-reaction crash of two UPS trucks, a FedEx truck, and at least one other vehicle. Five people were killed, at least 60 people were injured, and an  stretch of the Pennsylvania Turnpike was shut down in both directions as the crash was being investigated.

Crash 
On January 4, 2020, a tour bus operated by Z&D Tour, en route from Rockaway, New Jersey, to Cincinnati, Ohio, and carrying several foreign tourists, left Flushing, Queens, around 10 pm, with stops in Manhattan and Hackensack, New Jersey, with a planned crew shift in New Stanton, Pennsylvania.

A motor coach from New York went out of control while passing another vehicle, and landed on its side. Police stated that  the tour bus veered off towards the median and onto the paved left shoulder, before veering towards the right and crossed all travel lanes before colliding with the embankment. It then rolled onto its side and lay across all the westbound lanes, before it was struck by a FedEx Ground tractor-trailer and then a UPS tractor-trailer. The accident caused another, as a third tractor-trailer crashed into a car attempting to avoid the original crash. A Mercedes struck the side of the UPS tractor-trailer, which was then struck by another UPS tractor-trailer, resulting in the Mercedes being pinned between the two trucks.

Victims 
The five individuals killed were:
Shuang Qing Feng, 58, the bus driver, of Flushing, Queens, New York City
Eileen Zelis Aria, 35, a passenger on the bus, of The Bronx, New York City 
Jaremy Vazquez, 9, a passenger on the bus, of Brooklyn, New York City
Dennis Kehler, 48, a UPS employee of Lebanon, Pennsylvania
Daniel Kepner, 53, a UPS employee of Lewistown, Pennsylvania

At least 60 people, aged 7 to 52 years old, were injured and transported to hospitals in the Pittsburgh area.

Investigation 
The National Transportation Safety Board opened an investigation. The organization evaluated the occupant protection, human performance, vehicle performance, the Pennsylvania Turnpike Commission's snow- and ice-removal procedures, collision avoidance technology installed on the three trucks, and the safety culture of the tour group organization. The organization also used drones to collect detailed surveys of the vehicles and the crash site, and partnered with the medical investigators and mechanics.

Aftermath 
Both the eastbound and westbound lanes of the turnpike were completely shut down between Breezewood and New Stanton for over 12 hours. UPS issued a statement saying Kehler was a 28-year employee and Kepner was a 5-year employee of the company, and said they were riding together in a truck from the company's Harrisburg facility. FedEx stated that they were cooperating with investigators.

References

External links
 NTSB Preliminary Report - Highway: HWY20MH002

Bus incidents in the United States
2020 road incidents
Interstate 76 (Ohio–New Jersey)
Transportation disasters in Pennsylvania
2020 disasters in the United States
2020 in Pennsylvania
January 2020 events in the United States